Thomas Child may refer to:
 Thomas Child (MP) (died 1413), member of the Parliament of England for Salisbury
 Thomas Child Jr. (1818–1869), U.S. Representative from New York
 Thomas Child (minister) (1839–1906), Scottish minister of the New Church and writer
 Thomas Child (photographer) (1841–1898), British photographer known for work in China

See also 
Thomas Childs (1796–1853), U.S. soldier during the Mexican–American War
Tom Childs (1870–1951), Arizona miner and rancher